List of fish of the Mediterranean Sea consists of 712 species of fish.

Cyclostomata

 Myxine glutinosa
 Lampetra fluviatilis
 Petromyzon marinus

Chondrichthyes

Chimaeriformes 
 Chimaera monstrosa

Shark

 Sharpnose sevengill shark
 Bluntnose sixgill shark
 Bigeyed sixgill shark
 Bramble shark
 Gulper shark
 Dalatias licha
 Etmopterus spinax
 Oxynotus centrina
 Centroscymnus coelolepis	
 Somniosus rostratus
 Squalus acanthias	
 Squalus blainvillei	
 Squalus megalops
 Squalus uyato	
 Squatina aculeata
 Squatina oculata
 Squatina squatina
 Galeus atlanticus
 Galeus melastomus
 Scyliorhinus canicula
 Scyliorhinus stellaris
 Galeorhinus galeus
 Mustelus asterias
 Mustelus mustelus
 Mustelus punctulatus
 Carcharias taurus
 Odontaspis ferox
 Alopias superciliosus
 Alopias vulpinus
 Cetorhinus maximus
 Carcharodon carcharias
 Isurus oxyrinchus	
 Lamna nasus
 Carcharhinus altimus
 Carcharhinus amboinensis
 Carcharhinus brachyurus
 Carcharhinus brevipinna
 Carcharhinus falciformis
 Carcharhinus limbatus
 Carcharhinus longimanus
 Carcharhinus melanopterus
 Carcharhinus obscurus
 Carcharhinus plumbeus
 Galeocerdo cuvier
 Prionace glauca
 Rhizoprionodon acutus
 Sphyrna lewini	
 Sphyrna mokarran		
 Sphyrna tudes	
 Sphyrna zygaena

Batoidea 
 Pristis pectinata	
 Pristis pristis
 Torpedo fuscomaculata	
 Torpedo marmorata	
 Torpedo nobiliana	
 Torpedo torpedo
 Glaucostegus halavi
 Rhinobatos cemiculus
 Rhinobatos rhinobatos
 Dipturus batis
 Dipturus oxyrinchus 	
 Leucoraja circularis
 Leucoraja fullonica
 Leucoraja melitensis
 Leucoraja naevus
 Raja africana
  Raja asterias
 Raja brachyura
 Raja clavata
 Raja miraletus
 Raja montagui
 Raja polystigma	
 Raja radula
 Raja rondeleti	
 Raja undulata
 Rostroraja alba
 Dasyatis centroura	
 Dasyatis chrysonota
 Dasyatis marmorata	
 Dasyatis pastinaca
 Dasyatis tortonesei
 Himantura uarnak
 Pteroplatytrygon violacea
 Taeniura grabata
 Urogymnus asperrimus
 Gymnura altavela
 Mobula mobular	
 Myliobatis aquila
 Pteromylaeus bovinus
 Rhinoptera marginata

Osteichthyes

Acipenseriformes 
 Acipenser naccarii
 Acipenser stellatus	
 Acipenser sturio	
 Huso huso

Anguilliformes 
 Anguilla anguilla
 Ariosoma balearicum	
 Conger conger
 Gnathophis mystax	
 Rhynchoconger trewavasae
 Chlopsis bicolor
 Panturichthys fowleri	
 Anarchias euryurus	
 Enchelycore anatina
 Gymnothorax unicolor	
 Muraena helena
 Cynoponticus ferox
 Muraenesox cinereus
 Nemichthys scolopaceus	
 Facciolella oxyrhyncha	
 Nettastoma melanurum
 Saurenchelys cancrivora
 Apterichtus anguiformis 	
 Apterichtus caecus 		
 Dalophis imberbis 	
 Echelus myrus 	
 Mystriophis crosnieri		
 Ophichthus ophis 	
 Ophichthus rufus
 Ophisurus serpens	
 Pisodonophis semicinctus
 Serrivomer brevidentatus 	
 Dysomma brevirostre

Notacanthiformes 
 Halosaurus ovenii
 Notacanthus bonaparte	
 Polyacanthonotus rissoanus

Clupeiformes 
 Alosa agone	
 Alosa alosa	
 Alosa fallax
 Dussumieria elopsoides
 Etrumeus teres
 Herklotsichthys punctatus
 Sardina pilchardus	
 Sardinella aurita	
 Sardinella maderensis	
 Spratelloides delicatulus
 Sprattus sprattus
 Engraulis encrasicolus

Siluriformes 
 Arius parkii
 Netuma thalassina
 Plotosus lineatus

Argentiniformes
 Argentina sphyraena
 Alepocephalus rostratus
 Glossanodon leioglossus
 Microstoma microstoma	
 Nansenia iberica
 Nansenia oblita

Salmoniformes 
 Salmo salar	
 Salmo trutta

Stomiiformes 
 Argyropelecus hemigymnus		
 Argyropelecus olfersii
 Maurolicus muelleri
 Cyclothone braueri		
 Cyclothone microdon	
 Cyclothone pygmaea
 Gonostoma denudatum		
 Valenciennellus tripunctulatus
 Bathophilus nigerrimus	
 Bathophilus vaillanti	
 Borostomias antarcticus		
 Chauliodus sloani		
 Stomias boa
 Ichthyococcus ovatus	
 Vinciguerria attenuata	
 Vinciguerria poweriae

Aulopiformes 
 Alepisaurus ferox	
 Aulopus filamentosus	
 Chlorophthalmus agassizi
 Bathysaurus mollis
 Bathypterois dubius 	
 Bathypterois grallator
 Evermannella balbo	
 Arctozenus rissi	
 Lestidiops jayakari	
 Lestidiops sphyrenoides 	
 Lestidium atlanticum	
 Paralepis coregonoides
 Paralepis speciosa	
 Sudis hyalina
 Saurida undosquamis
 Synodus saurus

Myctophiformes 
 Benthosema glaciale	
 Ceratoscopelus maderensis 		
 Diaphus holti	
 Diaphus metopoclampus
 Diaphus rafinesquii	
 Diogenichthys atlanticus 	
 Electrona risso	
 Gonichthys cocco	
 Hygophum benoiti	
 Hygophum hygomii	
 Lampanyctus crocodilus
 Lampanyctus pusillus 	
 Lobianchia dofleini	
 Lobianchia gemellarii	
 Myctophum punctatum	
 Notoscopelus bolini	
 Notoscopelus elongatus
 Notoscopelus kroyeri
 Symbolophorus veranyi

Zeiformes 
 Zeus faber
 Zenopsis conchifer

Gadiformes 
 Coelorinchus caelorhincus	
 Coelorinchus occa	
 Coryphaenoides guentheri	
 Coryphaenoides mediterraneus	
 Hymenocephalus italicus	
 Nezumia aequalis		
 Nezumia sclerorhynchus	
 Trachyrincus scabrus		
 Merluccius merluccius
 Eretmophorus kleinenbergi	
 Gadella maraldi
 Guttigadus latifrons	
 Lepidion guentheri	
 Lepidion lepidion
 Mora moro
 Physiculus dalwigki
 Rhynchogadus hepaticus	
 Phycis blennoides			
 Phycis phycis	
 Gaidropsarus biscayensis
 Gaidropsarus granti
 Gaidropsarus mediterraneus
 Gaidropsarus vulgaris
 Molva dypterygia
 Molva macrophthalma
 Molva molva
 Gadiculus argenteus
 Merlangius merlangus
 Micromesistius poutassou
 Trisopterus luscus
 Trisopterus minutus

Beryciformes 
 Beryx decadactylus	
 Beryx splendens
 Sargocentron praslin
 Sargocentron rubrum
 Aulotrachichthys sajademalensis	
 Gephyroberyx darwinii
 Hoplostethus mediterraneus

Lampriformes 
 Lampris guttatus
 Lophotus lacepede	
 Regalecus glesne
 Trachipterus arcticus	
 Trachipterus trachypterus	
 Zu cristatus

Lophiiformes 
 Lophius budegassa	
 Lophius piscatorius
 Chaunax suttkusi

Ophidiiformes 
 Bellottia apoda		
 Cataetyx alleni	
 Cataetyx laticeps	
 Grammonus ater
 Carapus acus		
 Echiodon dentatus		
 Echiodon drummondii		
 Benthocometes robustus 	   		
 Ophidion barbatum	
 Ophidion rochei	
 Parophidion vassali

Mugilidae 
 Chelon labrosus		
 Liza aurata	
 Liza carinata
 Liza haematocheila
 Liza ramada	
 Liza saliens		
 Mugil cephalus		
 Oedalechilus labeo
 Jamie minimus

Atherinomorpha 
 Atherina boyeri	
 Atherina hepsetus	
 Atherina presbyter
 Atherinomorus lacunosus
 Belone belone	
 Belone svetovidovi	
 Tylosurus acus		
 Tylosurus choram
 Scomberesox saurus saurus
 Cheilopogon exsiliens	
 Cheilopogon furcatus
 Cheilopogon heterurus			
 Exocoetus obtusirostris
 Exocoetus volitans
 Hirundichthys rondeletii	
 Hirundichthys speculiger
 Parexocoetus mento
 Hemiramphus far
 Hyporhamphus affinis
 Hyporhamphus picarti
 Aphanius dispar dispar		
 Aphanius fasciatus		
 Aphanius iberus

Syngnathiformes 
 Fistularia commersonii
 Fistularia petimba
 Macroramphosus scolopax	
 Entelurus aequoreus
 Hippocampus fuscus
 Hippocampus guttulatus
 Hippocampus hippocampus
 Minyichthys sentus 	
 Nerophis lumbriciformis 	
 Nerophis maculatus	 	
 Nerophis ophidion	
 Syngnathus abaster	 	
 Syngnathus acus	
 Syngnathus phlegon	
 Syngnathus rostellatus
 Syngnathus taenionotus
 Syngnathus tenuirostris
 Syngnathus typhle

Serranidae 
 Anthias anthias
 Cephalopholis taeniops
 Epinephelus aeneus	
 Epinephelus caninus	
 Epinephelus coioides
 Epinephelus costae			
 Epinephelus malabaricus
 Epinephelus marginatus	
 Hyporthodus haifensis		
 Mycteroperca rubra		
 Serranus atricauda		
 Serranus cabrilla		
 Serranus hepatus	
 Serranus scriba

Scorpaeniformes 
 Helicolenus dactylopterus		
 Trachyscorpia cristulata
 Pontinus kuhlii	
 Pterois miles
 Scorpaena azorica
 Scorpaena elongata		
 Scorpaena loppei	
 Scorpaena maderensis	
 Scorpaena notata	
 Scorpaena porcus		
 Scorpaena scrofa	
 Scorpaena stephanica
 Scorpaenodes arenai		
 Sebastapistes mauritiana
 Elates ransonnetti
 Papilloculiceps longiceps
 Platycephalus indicus
 Sorsogona prionota
 Chelidonichthys cuculus	
 Chelidonichthys lucerna	
 Chelidonichthys obscurus	
 Eutrigla gurnardus	
 Lepidotrigla cavillone		
 Lepidotrigla dieuzeidei	
 Trigla lyra	
 Trigloporus lastoviza
 Peristedion cataphractum

Cottoidei 
 Taurulus bubalis
 Eutelichthys leptochirus
 Paraliparis murieli	
 Melanostigma atlanticum
 Cyclopterus lumpus

Percoidei 
 Synagrops japonicus	
 Apogon imberbis
 Apogon queketti
 Apogon smithi
 Apogonichthyoides nigripinnis
 Apogonichthyoides pharaonis
 Apogonichthyoides taeniatus
 Brama brama		
 Callanthias ruber	   	
 Centracanthus cirrus		
 Spicara maena	
 Spicara smaris	
 Cepola macrophthalma		
 Chaetodon hoefleri	
 Chaetodon melannotus
 Heniochus intermedius
 Platax teira
 Epigonus constanciae	
 Epigonus denticulatus		
 Epigonus telescopus	
 Microichthys coccoi	
 Microichthys sanzoi
 Parapristipoma humile			
 Parapristipoma octolineatum			
 Plectorhinchus mediterraneus	
 Pomadasys incisus	
 Pomadasys stridens
 Kyphosus saltatrix		
 Equulites klunzingeri
 Lobotes surinamensis	
 Lutjanus argentimaculatus
 Lutjanus jocu
 Dicentrarchus labrax	
 Dicentrarchus punctatus	   	
 Mullus barbatus	
 Mullus surmuletus		
 Parupeneus forsskali		
 Pseudupeneus prayensis	
 Upeneus moluccensis
 Upeneus pori
 Nemipterus japonicus
 Nemipterus randalli
 Pempheris vanicolensis
 Pomatomus saltatrix
 Galeoides decadactylus	
 Polyprion americanus	   		
 Priacanthus arenatus	
 Rachycentron canadum
  Argyrosomus regius		
 Sciaena umbra	
 Umbrina canariensis	
 Umbrina cirrosa	
 Umbrina ronchus
 Sillago sihama
 Boops boops	
 Crenidens crenidens
 Dentex dentex	
 Dentex gibbosus	
 Dentex macrophthalmus		
 Dentex maroccanus	
 Diplodus annularis	
 Diplodus bellottii
 Diplodus cervinus	
 Diplodus puntazzo		
 Diplodus sargus
 Diplodus vulgaris	
 Lithognathus mormyrus		
 Oblada melanura	
 Pagellus acarne		
 Pagellus bellottii	
 Pagellus bogaraveo			
 Pagellus erythrinus	
 Pagrus auriga	
 Pagrus caeruleostictus
 Pagrus major		
 Pagrus pagrus		
 Rhabdosargus haffara
 Sarpa salpa
 Sparus aurata		
 Spondyliosoma cantharus
 Pelates quadrilineatus
 Terapon puta
 Terapon theraps

Gobiidae 
 Aphia minuta
 Bathygobius soporator	
 Buenia affinis
 Buenia jeffreysii
 Chromogobius quadrivittatus	
 Chromogobius zebratus
 Corcyrogobius liechtensteini
 Coryogalops ocheticus
 Crystallogobius linearis
 Deltentosteus collonianus
 Deltentosteus quadrimaculatus	
 Didogobius bentuvii
 Didogobius schlieweni
 Didogobius splechtnai
 Favonigobius melanobranchus
 Gammogobius steinitzi
 Gobius ater
 Gobius auratus
 Gobius bucchichi	
 Gobius cobitis
 Gobius couchi
 Gobius cruentatus
 Gobius fallax
 Gobius geniporus
 Gobius kolombatovici	
 Gobius niger
 Gobius paganellus
 Gobius roulei
 Gobius strictus
 Gobius vittatus
 Gobius xanthocephalus	
 Gobiusculus flavescens
 Knipowitschia caucasica
 Knipowitschia panizzae
 Lebetus guilleti
 Lesueurigobius friesii
 Lesueurigobius sanzi
 Lesueurigobius suerii
 Millerigobius macrocephalus
 Neogobius melanostomus
 Odondebuenia balearica
 Oxyurichthys papuensis
 Oxyurichthys petersi
 Pomatoschistus bathi
 Pomatoschistus canestrinii
 Pomatoschistus knerii
 Pomatoschistus marmoratus
 Pomatoschistus microps
 Pomatoschistus minutus
 Pomatoschistus norvegicus
 Pomatoschistus pictus
 Pomatoschistus quagga
 Pomatoschistus tortonesei
 Pseudaphya ferreri
 Silhouettea aegyptia
 Speleogobius trigloides
 Thorogobius ephippiatus
 Thorogobius macrolepis
 Vanneaugobius dollfusi
 Vanneaugobius pruvoti
 Zebrus zebrus
 Zosterisessor ophiocephalus

Blenniidae 
 Aidablennius sphynx
 Blennius ocellaris
 Coryphoblennius galerita
 Hypleurochilus bananensis
 Lipophrys adriaticus
 Lipophrys canevae
 Lipophrys dalmatinus
 Lipophrys nigriceps
 Lipophrys pholis
 Omobranchus punctatus
 Parablennius gattorugine
 Parablennius incognitus
 Parablennius pilicornis
 Parablennius rouxi
 Parablennius sanguinolentus
 Parablennius tentacularis
 Parablennius zvonimiri
 Paralipophrys trigloides
 Petroscirtes ancylodon
 Salaria basilisca
 Salaria pavo
 Scartella cristata

Callionymidae 
 Clinitrachus argentatus
 Tripterygion delaisi
 Tripterygion melanurum
 Tripterygion tripteronotum
 Callionymus fasciatus
 Callionymus filamentosus
 Callionymus lyra
 Callionymus maculatus
 Callionymus pusillus
 Callionymus reticulatus	
 Callionymus risso
 Synchiropus phaeton

Gobiesocidae 
 Apletodon dentatus
 Apletodon incognitus
 Apletodon microcephalus
 Diplecogaster bimaculata
 Gouania willdenowi
 Lepadogaster candolii	
 Lepadogaster lepadogaster
 Lepadogaster purpurea
 Opeatogenys gracilis

Labridae 
 Acantholabrus palloni
 Centrolabrus exoletus
 Centrolabrus trutta
 Coris julis
 Ctenolabrus rupestris
 Iniistius pavo
 Labrus bergylta
 Labrus merula
 Labrus mixtus
 Labrus viridis
 Lappanella fasciata
 Pteragogus pelycus
 Symphodus bailloni
 Symphodus cinereus
 Symphodus doderleini
 Symphodus mediterraneus
 Symphodus melanocercus
 Symphodus melops
 Symphodus ocellatus
 Symphodus roissali
 Symphodus rostratus
 Symphodus tinca
 Thalassoma pavo
 Xyrichtys novacula
 Scarus ghobban
 Sparisoma cretense

Pomacentridae 
 Abudefduf vaigiensis
 Chromis chromis
 Chromis viridis

Carangoidei 
 Echeneis naucrates
 Remora australis
 Remora brachyptera
 Remora osteochir
 Remora remora
 Coryphaena equiselis
 Coryphaena hippurus
 Alectis alexandrinus
 Alepes djedaba
 Campogramma glaycos
 Caranx crysos
 Caranx hippos
 Caranx rhonchus
 Decapterus macarellus
 Decapterus punctatus
 Decapterus russelli
 Elagatis bipinnulata
 Lichia amia
 Naucrates ductor
 Pseudocaranx dentex
 Selene dorsalis
 Seriola carpenteri
 Seriola dumerili
 Seriola fasciata
 Seriola rivoliana
 Trachinotus ovatus
 Trachurus mediterraneus
 Trachurus picturatus
 Trachurus trachurus

Stromateoidei 
 Centrolophus niger
 Hyperoglyphe perciformis
 Schedophilus medusophagus
 Schedophilus ovalis
 Cubiceps capensis
 Cubiceps gracilis
 Psenes pellucidus
 Pampus argenteus
 Stromateus fiatola

Sphyraenidae 
 Sphyraena chrysotaenia
 Sphyraena flavicauda
 Sphyraena obtusata
 Sphyraena sphyraena
 Sphyraena viridensis

Xiphioidei 
 Istiophorus platypterus
 Makaira indica
 Makaira nigricans
 Tetrapturus albidus
 Tetrapturus belone
 Tetrapturus georgii
 Xiphias gladius

Scombroidei 
 Ruvettus pretiosus
 Lepidopus caudatus
 Trichiurus lepturus
 Acanthocybium solandri
 Auxis rochei rochei
 Auxis thazard
 Euthynnus alletteratus
 Katsuwonus pelamis
 Orcynopsis unicolor
 Rastrelliger kanagurta
 Sarda sarda
 Scomber colias
 Scomber scombrus
 Scomberomorus commerson
 Scomberomorus tritor
 Thunnus alalunga
 Thunnus thynnus

Trachinoidei 
 Ammodytes tobianus
 Champsodon nudivittis
 Champsodon vorax
 Gymnammodytes cicerelus
 Gymnammodytes semisquamatus
 Pinguipes brasilianus
 Uranoscopus scaber
 Echiichthys vipera
 Trachinus aranaeus
 Trachinus draco
 Trachinus radiatus

Pleuronectiformes 
 Arnoglossus grohmanni
 Arnoglossus imperialis
 Arnoglossus kessleri
 Arnoglossus laterna
 Arnoglossus rueppelii
 Arnoglossus thori
 Bothus podas
 Citharus linguatula
 Platichthys flesus
 Pleuronectes platessa
 Lepidorhombus boscii
 Lepidorhombus whiffiagonis
 Psetta maxima
 Scophthalmus rhombus
 Zeugopterus punctatus
 Zeugopterus regius
 Bathysolea profundicola
 Buglossidium luteum
 Dicologlossa cuneata
 Dicologlossa hexophthalma
 Microchirus azevia
 Microchirus boscanion
 Microchirus ocellatus
 Microchirus variegatus
 Monochirus hispidus
 Pegusa impar
 Pegusa lascaris
 Solea aegyptiaca
 Solea senegalensis
 Solea solea
 Synaptura lusitanica
 Synapturichthys kleinii
 Cynoglossus sinusarabici
 Symphurus ligulatus
 Symphurus nigrescens

Acanthuroidei 
 Acanthurus monroviae
 Luvarus imperialis
 Siganus luridus
 Siganus rivulatus

Tetraodontiformes 
 Balistes capriscus
 Cyclichthys spilostylus
 Diodon hystrix
 Mola mola
 Ranzania laevis
 Stephanolepis diaspros
 Acanthostracion notacanthus
 Acanthostracion quadricornis
 Lactophrys trigonus
 Tetrosomus gibbosus
 Tetragonurus cuvieri
 Arothron hispidus
 Ephippion guttifer
 Lagocephalus lagocephalus
 Lagocephalus sceleratus
 Lagocephalus spadiceus
 Lagocephalus suezensis
 Sphoeroides marmoratus
 Sphoeroides pachygaster
 Torquigener flavimaculosus
 Tylerius spinosissimus

Other
 Halobatrachus didactylus
 Gasterosteus aculeatus
 Dactylopterus volitans
 Capros aper

Gallery

References

Sources 
 Bent J. Muus, Jørgen G. Nielsen: Die Meeresfische Europas. In Nordsee, Ostsee und Atlantik. Franckh-Kosmos Verlag, .
 Matthias Bergbauer, Bernd Humberg: Was lebt im Mittelmeer? 1999, Franckh-Kosmos Verlag, .
 Fishbase: Fishspecies in Mediterranean Sea
 Jennings G.H. MedFish 2000 The taxonomic checklist and the 2004 CD Update. Calypso Publications, London:, .

See also 
 List of fish of the Black Sea

'
Mediterranean
Mediterranean-related lists